is a Japanese manga artist. After working in the Toho marketing department for a while, he made his manga debut by winning the 1st Shōnen Jump Original Manga Work Contest in 1978.

Works
Amaban! Kochira "Amagasa Bangumi Seisakubu"
Kyōtei Shōjo, 14 volumes, 1996–2003
Sangokushi Meigentan
Tennis Boy, 14 volumes, 1980–1982
Tokonatsu Shokudō Nankurunaisa, 3 volumes, 2005-current
Winning Shot, 1 volume
Wolf ni Kiss, 2 volumes, 1986
Yūsha no Karute

References

1949 births
Living people
Manga artists from Tokyo
People from Tokyo